Someday This Pain Will Be Useful to You is a 2011 comedy-drama film directed by Roberto Faenza based on Peter Cameron's novel of the same name. It is primarily Italian financed, but was shot in English. The teenage American protagonist was played by eighteen-year-old English actor Toby Regbo and the supporting cast is mainly American.

The film premiered at the 2011 Rome Film Festival and was scheduled for release in Italy in February 2012. It received its North American premiere at the 2012 Miami International Film Festival, but no further cinematic release dates have been announced.

The Italian reviews were mixed, but considerable praise was given for Regbo's performance.

Premise
A drama that follows James Sveck (Toby Regbo), a recent high school graduate in New York City, who feels out of step with his privileged upbringing.

Cast
 Toby Regbo as James Sveck
 Marcia Gay Harden as Marjorie Dunfour
 Peter Gallagher as Paul Sveck
 Deborah Ann Woll as Gillian Sveck
 Ellen Burstyn as James Sveck's grandmother
 Siobhan Fallon Hogan as Mrs. Beemer
 Lucy Liu as Rowena Adler, life coach
 Stephen Lang as Barry Rogers
 Gilbert Owuor as John Webster
 Aubrey Plaza as Real Estate Agent

Production
Filming took place in New York from August 18 to October 4, 2010.

References

External links
 
 
 

2011 films
American comedy-drama films
Italian comedy-drama films
2011 comedy-drama films
2010s English-language films
English-language Italian films
Films based on American novels
Films directed by Roberto Faenza
Films shot in New York City
Films set in New York City
2010s American films